Aswat Almadina, (Arabic: أصوات المدينة), meaning "Voices of the City", is a modern Sudanese music band, founded in 2016 in the capital Khartoum. Their original songs are influenced both by Sudanese urban music of the 21st century as well as by international pop music styles. Their lyrics are sung in Sudanese Arabic, accompanied by electric guitars, percussion and keyboards. Using metaphors that everyone in Sudan understands, lead singer Ibrahim Ibn Albadya sings about social issues or Sudanese everyday culture. Their motto "Love and peace" as well as improvised performances in public spaces of the Khartoum metropolitan area gained them a reputation of being concerned with community issues, for example by collecting waste from the streets before playing their songs to the local audience. Due to their involvement as active part of the civil society the band was selected as National Goodwill Ambassador for UNDP in Sudan.

Through live concerts, music videos and social media, the band quickly became popular, especially with young people. Aswat Almadina have produced two albums, the first was called Khashab ("Wood") and the second Logat Alshware, which means "language of the streets". In 2016, the German Cultural Centre in Khartoum produced two of their songs for an international project featuring music videos from Sudan, Egypt and the Middle East.

See also 

 Music of Sudan
 Arabic pop music

References

External links
 Aswat Almadina on Facebook
 Aswat Almadina on Youtube:
 Who's more powerful
 Halaly

Sudanese musicians
Sudanese culture
Sudanese artists
Sudanese singers